Kumkum Na Pagla Padya is a Gujarati TV series airs on Colors Gujarati. It is produced by SanGo Telefilms. The show premiered on 20 April 2015 on Colors Gujarati.

Plot summary
The story revolves around a girl named Kumkum Devendrabhai Gadhavi, living in the small tow named Sukhadvanj located in Gujarat. Kumkum is said to have a magical power of healing people. This is believed due to her extreme faith in Maa Durga (Goddess of Victory of Good over Evil). She is married to Jai Gordhandas Seth - son of a very rich man Seth Gordhandas. He has irreversible bipolar disorder which went very severe and has turned Jai to a very temperamental person. Before her marriage, Kumkum was unknown about this. Even though it is a forced relationship, she accepts her destiny willingly, despite knowing the extremities she might face in this wedlock and this is all about how Kumkum manages her marriage life and relationship with her Family-in-law.

Cast
Khanjan Thumbar - As Jai
Swetal M. Solanki - As Kumkum
Puja Joshi - As Kumkum
Uday Majmudar - As Purushottamdas Seth
Ravisha Parikh - As Pooja
Pratap Sachdev - As Devendra Gadhvi A.K.A Devubha
Salil Upadhyay - As Jayesh
Parth Thaker - As Mahesh

Indian television shows
Colors Gujarati original programming
Gujarati-language television shows